Kobestelia is a genus of moths of the family Euteliidae. The genus was erected by Jeremy Daniel Holloway in 1985.

Species
Kobestelia obliquata (Walker, [1863]) Peninsular Malaysia, Sumatra, Borneo
Kobestelia rosea (Holloway, 1985) Borneo, Sumatra, Peninsular Malaysia

References

Euteliinae